Edna “Eddy” Thomas is a Papua New Guinean former footballer and current manager. She has been a member of the Papua New Guinea women's national team.

Club career
Thomas has played for Bara in Papua New Guinea.

International career
Thomas capped for Papua New Guinea at senior level during the 2010 OFC Women's Championship.

References

Living people
Papua New Guinean women's footballers
Papua New Guinea women's international footballers
Papua New Guinean football managers
Women's association football managers
Female association football managers
Year of birth missing (living people)
Women's association footballers not categorized by position